Sri Venkateswara National Park is a national park and biosphere reserve in Tirupati of Andhra Pradesh, India. The total area of the park is 353 km2. The park is known for its many waterfalls, including the Talakona, Gundalakona and Gunjana. As the government of India declared the Seshachalam Hills as one of the biosphere reserves of India in 2010, this national park becomes the part of it.

Geography
The National Park is located in Eastern Ghats spread over the Seshachalam hills of Annamaya district and Tirumala hills of Tirupati district. The elevation varies from 150 to 1,130 m. The terrain is undulating with forest covered valleys. Most of the rainfall is received from the northeast monsoon and a little from the southwest monsoon. The vegetation here is a mix of dry deciduous and moist deciduous types.

Average rainfall in the region is 900 mm. The average temperature of the region varies from 12 °C to 44 °C.

Flora and fauna

Flora

The vegetation in the national park consists of dry deciduous mixed forest with patches of moist deciduous forests in the valleys. The area has about 1,500 vascular plant species belonging to 174 families, of which many are endemic. Some of the rare and endemic plant species like red sanders, Shorea talura, Shorea thumburggaia, Terminalia pallida, sandalwood, Cycas beddomei, Syzygium alternifolium, Psilotum nudum occur in this region.

Fauna

About 178 species of birds from this national park have been identified. The globally threatened yellow-throated bulbul is seen here. grey-fronted green pigeon, a bird of the Himalayas and the Western Ghats is quite common in these forests. The critically endangered Oriental white-backed vulture is found in the national park. Some of the other birds found here are:

large hawk-cuckoo, blue-faced malkoha, yellow-browed bulbul, Indian scimitar-babbler and Loten's sunbird.

In 1984 the Asian elephant, not seen in Andhra Pradesh for nearly 300 years, re-appeared in the southern part of Chittoor district. In 1993, a breakaway herd of five individuals moved to the Chamala Valley of Tirumala forests in this national park.

Among predators the leopard is quite common, along with the wild dog. Other predators include golden jackal, Indian fox, small Indian civet and jungle cat. Sloth bear is frequently encountered. Sambar, spotted deer, mouse deer, barking deer, four-horned antelope and wild boar are the main ungulates. The nocturnal slender loris could be common but is seldom seen. The Indian giant squirrel and tree shrew are other interesting species.

Among reptiles, the most interesting species is the gliding lizard, found in some deep forested valleys. Another important reptile of this national park is the Indian golden gecko. Originally reported from rocky ravines in the Eastern Ghats, the Indian golden gecko was rediscovered from the same area in 1985

Threats

The key threats the national park are construction and quarrying. The Andhra Pradesh State Highway Project, is undertaking the upgrade of highways in the state of Andhra Pradesh, and this includes construction of Warangal-Pollacolu road, which passes close to the western boundary of the national park. Another construction is of the Kapil Teertham Dam inside the national park by the Andhra Pradesh Government and the Tirumala Tirupati Devasthanam. Both these construction projects raise concerns over the potential impact of the road and the dam on the habitat and the wildlife in the sanctuary. Regular forest fires are also a constant threat to the biodiversity and ecological balance in the park.

References

External links

National parks in Andhra Pradesh
Eastern Ghats
Tirumala Tirupati Devasthanams
Tirupati district
Geography of Tirupati district
1989 establishments in Andhra Pradesh
Protected areas established in 1989